AWT may stand for:

The Abstract Window Toolkit, part of the Java programming language
Antony Worrall Thompson, the British chef
Aphrodite World Tour, a 2011 concert tour by Australian pop/dance singer Kylie Minogue
Armathwaite railway station, England; National Rail station code AWT
Airborne wind turbine, a concept design wind turbine
Withholding tax, Automatic Withholding Tax (also known as WHT)
Advanced World Transport, Czech cargo railway operator
Alternative Waste Treatment, a subset of waste treatment. List of solid waste treatment technologies